Mainliner are a noise rock band from Tokyo, Japan. The band was formed in 1995 by guitarist Kawabata Makoto and bassist Asahito Nanjo with the intention of creating a new form of psychedelic music. They released four studio albums before the members went on hiatus to pursue other musical interests. On December 20, 2011 Kawabata Makoto, Koji Shimura and newcomer Kawabe Taigen began recording material. The music from these sessions was released on May 13, 2013 on the new album Revelation Space. The band intended to take part in a world tour in support of the new album, starting with the UK that September.

Discography 
Mellow Out (1996, Charnel Music)
Mainliner Sonic (1997, Charnel Music)
Psychedelic Polyhedron (1997, Fractal)
Imaginative Plain (2001, P.S.F.)
Revelation Space (2013, Riot Season)
Dual Myths (2021, Riot Season)

References

External links 
 
 
 

Japanese rock music groups
Japanese noise rock groups
Musical groups established in 1995
Musical groups from Tokyo
P.S.F. Records artists